Maid is an American drama limited series created for Netflix by Molly Smith Metzler. The series is inspired by Stephanie Land's memoir Maid: Hard Work, Low Pay, and a Mother's Will to Survive. Its story focuses on a young mother who escapes an abusive relationship, subsequently struggling to provide for her daughter by getting a job cleaning houses. It premiered on Netflix on October 1, 2021.

It received critical acclaim, with praise going towards the writing, tone, and performances (particularly Qualley's), and became Netflix's fourth most-watched show of the year. Its accolades include three Primetime Emmy Award nominations, including acting nomination for Qualley, and three Golden Globe nominations, specifically for Best Limited Series, as well as Best Actress in a Miniseries or Television Film (Qualley) and Best Supporting Actress in a Series, Miniseries or Television Film (MacDowell). In addition, Qualley was also nominated for a Critics' Choice Television Award and a Screen Actors Guild Award. In addition, the American Film Institute named it one of the ten best television programs of 2021.

Premise
Alex leaves her abusive boyfriend, moves herself and their toddler daughter into a shelter, and gets a job cleaning houses for Value Maids. The show follows Alex's struggles with raising a young child, dealing with both an abusive ex-boyfriend and her own dysfunctional family, and navigating the red tape of government assistance, all while working as a maid and dreaming of a future as a writer. The story takes place near Seattle with the Alex character frequently commuting via ferry to the fictional Fisher Island.

Cast and characters

Main

 Margaret Qualley as Alexandra "Alex" Russell, a young mother who leaves her emotionally abusive boyfriend, taking her two/three-year-old daughter Maddy and getting a job working as a maid.
 Nick Robinson as Sean Boyd, Alex's abusive ex and the father of her daughter, Maddy.
 Anika Noni Rose as Regina, a wealthy client of Alex's
 Tracy Vilar as Yolanda, Alex's boss at Value Maids
 Billy Burke as Hank, Alex's estranged father
 Andie MacDowell as Paula Langley, Alex's mother who has severe bipolar disorder

Recurring

 Rylea Nevaeh Whittet as Maddy Boyd, Alex and Sean's lively toddler daughter who turns three years old in the sixth episode
 Xavier De Guzman as Ethan, Sean's best friend
 Raymond Ablack as Nate, an acquaintance from Alex's past
 BJ Harrison as Denise, the woman who runs the domestic violence shelter
 Christie Burke as Tania, a friend of Sean and Alex
 Toby Levins as Basil, Paula's boyfriend

Guest stars

 Aimee Carrero as Danielle, a woman staying in the domestic violence shelter whom Alex befriends
 Mozhan Marnò as Tara, Alex's lawyer
 Théodore Pellerin as Wayne, Alex’s Tinder date

Episodes

Production

Development
On November 20, 2019, Netflix gave production a series order inspired by New York Times best-selling memoir Maid: Hard Work, Low Pay, and a Mother's Will to Survive by Stephanie Land. The series was created by Molly Smith Metzler who was also an executive producer alongside John Wells, Erin Jontow, Margot Robbie, Tom Ackerley, Brett Hedblom, and Land. Production companies involved with the series consisted of John Wells Productions, LuckyChap Entertainment, and Warner Bros. Television. Directors of the series included Wells, Nzingha Stewart, Lila Neugebauer, Helen Shaver, and Quyen "Q" Tran. The limited series was released on October 1, 2021.

Casting
In August 2020, Margaret Qualley and Nick Robinson were cast in leading roles. On September 14, 2020, Anika Noni Rose joined the cast in a leading role. In October 2020, Andie MacDowell, Tracy Vilar, and Billy Burke joined the cast in leading roles. On November 25, 2020, Xavi de Guzman joined the cast in a recurring role. Aimee Carrero landed a role as Danielle, who is a fellow survivor of domestic abuse and becomes friends with Alex, Margaret Qualley's character, at the women's shelter.

Filming
Principal photography for the series began on September 28, 2020, and concluded on April 9, 2021, in Victoria, British Columbia.

Reception

Audience viewership 
According to Netflix, Maid has been viewed by estimated 67 million households, becoming the streaming service's fourth most-watched show in 2021. In the streaming rankings for the week of October 4 to 10, Maid doubled its viewing time from the previous week and climbed to second place behind Squid Game with 1.9 billion minutes of viewing time. The series was watched for 469.09 million hours in the first 28 days of release.

Specifically, in the Netflix's Top 10 TV English titles ranking, during its debut week, Maid placed at number two just two days after its release with 61.08 million hours viewed. The following week, it topped the chart and garnered 166.52 million viewing hours. In its third week, it ranked at number two and generated 129.28 million viewing hours. The series remained in the chart for 13 weeks until December 26, 2021.

Critical response
Maid received critical acclaim. The review aggregator website Rotten Tomatoes reported a 94% approval rating with an average rating of 8.2/10, based on 49 critic reviews. The website's critics consensus reads, "Maid takes great care with its sensitive subject matter to craft a drama that is not always easy to watch, but undeniably powerful, grounded by an outstanding performance by Margaret Qualley." Metacritic, which uses a weighted average, assigned a score of 82 out of 100 based on 19 critics, indicating "universal acclaim".

Kristen Lopez of IndieWire gave the series an A and wrote, "We need more stories like this and, hands down, Maid deserves all the acclaim it gets." Reviewing the series for Rolling Stone, Alan Sepinwall gave a rating of four out of five stars and said, "Parts of it are deliberately difficult to get through, yet the show is surprisingly watchable given the nature of the story, and at times even light and charming. Much of this is a credit to Qualley, who delivers a movie-star-level performance."

Violence researcher Margunn Bjørnholt wrote that the series has received acclaim for "the way it depicts the violence and for painting a nuanced picture of the violent boyfriend."

The American Film Institute named the series one of the ten best television programs of the year.

Awards and nominations

References

External links

 

2020s American drama television miniseries
2021 American television series debuts
2021 American television series endings
English-language Netflix original programming
Television series by Warner Bros. Television Studios
Television shows filmed in Victoria, British Columbia
Television shows based on books
Television shows set in Washington (state)
Bipolar disorder in fiction